Happy End may refer to:

 Happy End (band), a Japanese folk rock group of the early 1970s
 Happy End (1970 album), written , their debut album
 Happy End (1973 album), their third album
 Happy End (musical), a 1929 musical play co-written by Bertolt Brecht and Elisabeth Hauptmann, with music by Kurt Weill
 Happy End (1967 film), a Czech film
 Happy End (1999 film), a Korean film, directed by Jung Ji-woo starring Choi Min-shik, Jeon Do-yeon, and Ju Jin-moo
 Happy End (2003 film), a French film directed by Amos Kollek
 Happy End (2009 film), a French film directed by Arnaud and Jean-Marie Larrieu
 Happy End (2017 film), a French film directed by Michael Haneke

See also
 Happy ending (disambiguation)
 The Happy End Problem, a 2006 album by Fred Frith